is a multi-purpose stadium in Hiroshima, Japan.  It is currently used mostly for football matches and was the home stadium of Sanfrecce Hiroshima until 1995.  The stadium holds 13,800 people.

External links 

Stadium information 

Football venues in Japan
AFC Asian Cup stadiums
Athletics (track and field) venues in Japan
Sports venues in Hiroshima
Multi-purpose stadiums in Japan
Sports venues completed in 1941
1941 establishments in Japan
Sanfrecce Hiroshima